Chillwave (originally considered synonymous with glo-fi and hypnagogic pop) is a music microgenre that emerged in the mid 2000s. It is characterized for evoking the popular music of the late 1970s and early 1980s while engaging with notions of memory and nostalgia. Common features include a faded or dreamy retro pop sound, escapist lyrics (frequent topics include the beach or summer), psychedelic or lo-fi aesthetics, mellow vocals, slow-to-moderate tempos, effects processing (especially reverb), and vintage synthesizers.

Chillwave was one of the first music genres to develop primarily through the Internet. The term was coined in 2009 by the satirical blog Hipster Runoff to lampoon microgenres and indie acts whose sounds resembled incidental music from 1980s VHS tapes. Prior to this, the music would have been labelled as shoegaze, dream pop, ambient, or indietronica. Leading acts included Neon Indian, Washed Out, and Toro y Moi, who gained attention during 2009's "Summer of Chillwave". Washed Out's 2009 track "Feel It All Around" remains the best-known chillwave song.

Many artists exploited the style's low-budget simplicity, which led to an oversaturation of acts that contributed to the original scene's demise. The phrase "chillwave" came to be used as a pejorative due to the music's perceived shallowness and reliance on nostalgia. Detractors also criticized the term for having been contrived by media publications. It heralded the early 2010s proliferation of Internet music microgenres, including vaporwave, which originated as an ironic variant of chillwave. By the mid-2010s, chillwave had faded in popularity, with most of the original artists and listeners of the genre shifting focus to other music styles.

Musical origins

Chillwave has been classified as psychedelia, bedroom pop, or electropop. Before a specific term for the music was coined, it was described as shoegaze, dream pop, ambient, or indietronica. Pitchforks Nitsuh Abebe writes that, since at least 1992, the style had existed for one principal reason: "stoned, happy college kids listening to records while they fall asleep." Abebe cited Slowdive, Darla Records' Blissed Out ambient compilations, and Casino Versus Japan's eponymous 1998 album as examples. One of the earliest known manifestations of the genre is the Beach Boys' song "All I Wanna Do" from their 1970 album Sunflower. Boards of Canada, whom Abebe says pre-chillwave music was often compared to, were also influential, as were Fennesz, and J Dilla's 2006 album Donuts.

Ariel Pink is frequently cited as "the godfather of chillwave". He initially gained recognition in the mid-2000s through a string of home-recorded albums that reconfigured 1970s radio-rock and 1980s new wave in a lo-fi setting. The Paw Tracks record label, which distributed Pink's albums, was run by Animal Collective, who signed Pink after being impressed by a CD of his home recordings, starting with The Doldrums (2000). Uncuts Sam Richard profiled Pink as "a lo-fi legend" whose "ghostly pop sound" proved influential to chillwave acts such as Ducktails and Toro y Moi. Critic Adam Harper disputed Pink's "godfather of chillwave" status, writing  that his influence on lo-fi scenes has been somewhat overstated, explaining that his music lacks "the mirror-shades-cool synth groove of chillwave ... Pink's albums are zany, personal, largely rock-based and dressed in awkward glam". Discussing chillwave's bedroom pop precursors, Allene Norton of Cellars opined that Pink is "definitely not chillwave but that kind of stuff influenced a lot of the artists making it, like Washed Out."

In March 2007, Animal Collective member Panda Bear (Noah Lennox) released his solo album Person Pitch, which is credited with launching the chillwave style. The album influenced a wide range of subsequent indie music, with its sound serving as the major inspiration for chillwave and a number of soundalikes. Animal Collective itself also contributed to the movement. Their album Merriweather Post Pavilion, released in January 2009, was particularly influential for its ambient sounds and repetitive melodies, but was not as tightly associated with the "hazy" psychedelia that chillwave was identified with. According to Flavorwires Tom Hawking, chillwave acts extrapolated "the sort of ill-defined pastoral nostalgia" from Animal Collective's early work "and spun it into an entire genre." However, "Animal Collective were never really part of that scene, such as it was — they were more like its spiritual overlords". 

In February 2008, Atlas Sound (Bradford Cox) debuted with the album Let the Blind Lead Those Who Can See but Cannot Feel. According to music journalist Larry Fitzmaurice, "it’s impossible to overstate Cox’s influence on [chillwave]" and he added that the album's "ice-sculpture ambient pop ... was streaked with themes of impermanence and memory, which would soon come to define chillwave as a whole." Lennox later contributed guest vocals to Cox's 2009 song "Walkabout", referred to as an "early chillwave totem" by Fitzmaurice.

Etymology and hypnagogic pop

Most accounts attribute "chillwave" to a July 2009 post written by "Carles", the anonymous manager of the blog Hipster Runoff. The site, which was active between 2008 and 2013, was known for its ironic posts on "alt" trends. Carles used the term to describe a host of emerging bands that appeared similar to each other. A July 27 post titled "Is WASHED OUT the next Neon Indian/Memory Cassette?" ruminated on a nascent trend involving the "musicsphere" searching for a "new 'authentic, undergroundish product' that isn't a huge brand like AnCo/GrizzBear/etc. ...  It seems easiest to have a chill project, that is somewhat 'conceptual' but also demonstrates that ur band has 'pop sensibilities' or something." He proposed a list of genre names, including "Chill Bro Core", "Pitchforkwavegaze", "forkshit", and "CumWave". The post concludes:

A few weeks later, in August, The Wire journalist David Keenan coined "hypnagogic pop" to describe a trend of 2000s lo-fi and post-noise music in which indie acts began to engage with elements of cultural nostalgia, childhood memory, and outdated recording technology. Chillwave initially became subsumed under the "hypnagogic pop" and "glo-fi" labels, although "glo-fi" quickly fell out of popular usage.

While chillwave and hypnagogic pop both evoke the cultural aesthetics of the 1980s and 1990s, chillwave espoused a more commercial sound that emphasized "cheesy" hooks and reverb effects. According to Pitchforks Miles Bowe, chillwave came to constitute a pejorative referencing the "cynical" rebranding of hypnagogic pop acts who had "streamlined [their] style to find genuine pop success." Keenan, who had previously championed hypnagogic pop, became disenchanted with many such artists, writing in 2011 that "in the reductive glare of mainstream media", chillwave had become "shorthand for a cheap form of revivalism and a valorising of bad taste".

Carles later explained that he had set out to throw "a bunch of pretty silly names on a blog post and [see] which one stuck." Neon Indian's Alan Palomo surmised that the tag caught on "because it was the most dismissive and sarcastic ... the term chillwave came when the era of blog-mediated music was at its height at that time." The term did not gain mainstream currency until early 2010, when it was the subject of articles by The Wall Street Journal and The New York Times.

Peak popularity

Summer of Chillwave and early vanguard

Chillwave flourished throughout 2008 and 2009, culminating with the 2009 "Summer of Chillwave", which was marked by an inundation of artists with names and song titles referencing summertime, the beach, or surfing. Songs were generally of low-to-moderate tempo and incorporated vintage, analog instrumentation that evoked the popular music of the late 1970s and early 1980s. Although it had no specific geographical source point, chillwave was concentrated in the southern and eastern coasts of the U.S., with Brooklyn, New York figuring the most prominently.  Neon Indian (Alan Palomo), Washed Out (Ernest Greene), and Toro y Moi (Chaz Bundick) were considered to be the vanguard of the chillwave movement. All three were one-man acts from the Southern U.S, while Greene and Bundick were acquaintances and collaborators.

Greene's "Feel It All Around" (July 2009) became the best known song of the genre, later to be employed as a backdrop for the opening sequence of the television series Portlandia (2011–2018). Created mostly from a slowed-down sample of Gary Low's 1983 song "I Want You", RBMAs Sian Rowe wrote that it "has all the things that chillwave would be defined by: lo-fi synths, laid-back filtered-out vocals and disposable camera-style photography that usually involves the beach or anything watery."

Neon Indian's debut Psychic Chasms (October 2009) was another early album that typified the genre, particularly the tracks "Deadbeat Summer", "Terminally Chill", and "Should've Taken Acid With You". Bundick's debut Causers of This (January 2010) drew similar attention for its style of old-fashioned, lo-fi pop. The album was acclaimed by critics and given an early endorsement by Kanye West, which lent the work significantly more popularity. Rolling Stone additionally dubbed Bundick the "godfather of chillwave".

Writing in 2019, Ian Cohen of Stereogum argued Dayve Hawke (variously known as Memory Tapes, Memory Cassette, and Weird Tapes) to be the fourth leading chillwave act of the era. Cohen identified Hawke's output as "quintessential chillwave documents", namely the 2009 album Seek Magic, "probably the best album of the bunch that dropped in 2009 — and, by definition, probably the greatest chillwave album of all time."

Vaporwave
Vaporwave is a microgenre of electronic music that originated as an ironic variant of chillwave. It was loosely derived from the work of hypnagogic artists such as Ariel Pink and James Ferraro, and was characterized by the invocation of retro popular culture as well as the "analog nostalgia" of the chillwave scene. Amplifying the experimental tendencies of hypnagogic pop, vaporwave is cleanly produced and composed almost entirely from samples. It relied on sources such as smooth jazz, retro elevator music, R&B, and dance music from the 1980s and 1990s, along with the application of slowed-down chopped and screwed techniques, looping, and other effects.

Writers, fans, and artists struggled to differentiate vaporwave, chillwave, and hypnagogic pop from each other. One of the descriptions of the genre that were levied by online forums was "chillwave for Marxists". Vaporwave found wider appeal over the middle of 2012, building an audience on sites like Last.fm, Reddit, and 4chan. A wealth of its own subgenres and offshoots—some of which deliberately gesture at the genre's non-seriousness—soon followed.

Decline

Chillwave reached its peak in mid-2010, the same year it was received with widespread criticism. Some of the common descriptors used for the music in reviews or blog posts became clichés, including "soundscapes", "dreamy", "lush", "glowing", and "sun-kissed". The Village Voices Christopher Weingarten remarked in December 2009 that "90 percent of writing about glo-fi mentions 'the summer' in some fashion. And summer's been over for, like, four months now."

The chillwave scene ultimately "withered and died". One major reason was a sudden oversaturation of artists, which came as a consequence of its simple production process. Writing in the New Times Broward-Palm Beach, Reed Fischer referred to Pitchforks negative review of Millionyoung's "perfectly fine album" Replicants (2011) as a declaration of the genre's demise. Explaining why the genre fell out of public favor, Bundick surmised that chillwave "did its thing, and once it became a thing, people stopped caring about it, even the artists [making it]."

In 2015, Fitzmaurice reflected that the "holy triumvirate" of Washed Out, Toro y Moi, and Neon Indian had maintained their careers in spite of the genre's decline. Tom Hawking predicted that the "chillwave era will most likely be a footnote to musical history, a faint flaring of middle-class angst in a frightening time for everyone. But that doesn't mean it's not worth examining regardless, because its simple existence says far more about a generation than the music itself ever did."

Legacy and critical perspective

Contemporary financial crisis, summertime, and escapism

Referencing the genre's Brooklyn-centric origins, Hawking noted that the "fact this was such beach-centric music makes it interesting ... chillwave also strikes me as hugely middle class music. ... whereas punk reacted with anger and a desire for change, chillwave was the sound of escapism and resignation. ... it's surely no coincidence that chillwave's rise coincided with the aftermath of the 2007 sub-prime economic meltdown."

Eric Grandy of The Stranger said that the genre's practitioners shared "a kind of fond nostalgia for some vague, idealized childhood. Its posture is a sonic shoulder shrug, a languorous, musical 'whatevs'." Another attempt at identifying the common threads of the scene was offered by Jon Pareles in The New York Times: "They're solo acts or minimal bands, often with a laptop at their core, and they trade on memories of electropop from the 1980s, with bouncing, blipping dance-music hooks (and often weaker lead voices). It's recession-era music: low-budget and danceable."

Vultures Frank Guan writes that the evocation of summer is not "as a season of deprivation and loss of control, but [as] a summer spent in suburban quiet and prosperity, chilling indoors alone with central A/C, watching daytime TV or listening to music." One unnamed Pitchfork writer opined: "This music isn't easy to write about. It takes a lot of work to get past 'soundtrack to the summer' and 'makes me want to hit the beach.' So much of this summer-obsessed lo-fi is about atmosphere and feel that it can seem weird to scrutinize it."

In November 2009, Pitchfork ran an editorial feature on the "summer of chillwave". The Beach Boys' Brian Wilson, who had been compared to Animal Collective, was mentioned as a "looming figure" throughout that summer's indie music. An unnamed editor argued that the similarities were more abstract than musical and that Wilson's influence stems from his legend as an "emotionally fragile dude with mental health problems who coped by taking drugs." The editor continued, "Summertime now is about disorientation: 'Should Have Taken Acid With You'; 'The Sun Was High (And So Am I)'; You take the fantasy of [Wilson's] music-- the cars, the sand, the surf-- add a dollop of melancholy and a smudge of druggy haze, and you have some good music for being alone in a room with only a computer to keep you company."

Internet music genres and validity

Chillwave was one of the first genres to acquire an identity online and one of the last phenomenons of indie music to predate Twitter's dominance of social media. According to writer Garin Pirnia, it is an example of linking musical trends by Internet outlets rather than geographic location. Pirnia wrote in 2010 (quoting Palomo), "Whereas musical movements were once determined by a city or venue where the bands congregated, 'now it's just a blogger or some journalist that can find three or four random bands around the country and tie together a few commonalities between them and call it a genre.'" In the description of The Guardians Emilie Friedlander, chillwave was "the internet electronic micro-genre that launched a hundred internet electronic micro-genres (think: vaporwave, witch house, seapunk, shitgaze, distroid, hard vapor), not to mention its corollaries in [2010s] internet rap, which largely shared its collagist, hyper-referential approach to sound."

Grantlands Dave Schilling argued that the term was created to reveal "how arbitrary and meaningless" existing labels such as "shoegaze" and "dream pop" were. George McIntire of the San Francisco Bay Guardian described chillwave's origin as in the "throes of the blogosphere" and called the term a "cheap, slap-on label used to describe grainy, dancey, lo-fi, 1980s inspired music" and a "disservice to any band associated with it."  In 2011, Carles said it was "ridiculous that any sort of press took it seriously" and that although the bands he spoke to "get annoyed" by the tag, "they understand that it's been a good thing. What about iTunes making it an official genre? It's now theoretically a marketable indie sound."

By 2015, the majority consensus was that chillwave was a fabricated non-genre. In 2016, Palomo described labels like "chillwave" and "vaporwave" as "arbitrary" and that he "couldn't have been more happy" about the "chillwave" descriptor falling out of favor. Toro y Moi's Chaz Bundick publicly expressed the following about the genre, saying, "I like the fact that I'm associated with it. It's cool. Not a lot of artists get a chance to be a part of some sort of movement, so I guess in a way I'm super flattered to be considered a part of that."

References

Bibliography

External links
 

 
2009 introductions
21st-century music genres
 
Pop music genres
Retro style
2000s neologisms
Microgenres
Indie music
Nostalgia
Electronic music genres